Albany is a ghost town in Caddo Parish, Louisiana, United States.

Ghost towns in Louisiana
Populated places in Caddo Parish, Louisiana
Former populated places in the Ark-La-Tex